César Alejandro Pérez Vivas (born April 24, 1957), is a Venezuelan lawyer and politician associated with COPEI in Táchira State. From 2008 until 2012 was the Governor of Táchira.

He studied the secondary level at Jáuregui, a military school from Táchira State. Later Pérez Vivas got graduated as a lawyer at Universidad Católica del Táchira. Finally he did the postgraduate level at Central University of Venezuela. Pérez Vivas worked also as a university lecturer.

Pérez Vivas was chosen Youth Secretary of COPEI -Táchira in 1977. Later he became National Youth Secretary of that party. From 2002 to 2007, Pérez Vivas was the General Secretary of COPEI. 
In 1983 Pérez Vivas was elected a deputy of the Asamblea Legislativa of Táchira State, a kind of state legislature. From 1988 to 1998 Pérez Vivas worked as a deputy of the Venezuelan National Congress. In 2000, he won a seat at the National Assembly of Venezuela. In 2005 he decided not to compete for a re-election as deputy.

On 28 September 2008, Pérez Vivas won a primary election done by some political parties opposed to Hugo Chávez to select the candidate to the governor's office of Táchira State. On 23 November, he became the winner during the Venezuelan regional elections with 49% of the votes, according to the first bulletin from the CNE.

See also 
Táchira state
List of Governors of States of Venezuela

References

Sources 
    www.cesarperezvivas.com 

Living people
Governors of Táchira
People from Táchira
Members of the National Assembly (Venezuela)
20th-century Venezuelan lawyers
1957 births
Copei politicians